Vernazza is a town and commune in Liguria, Italy.

Vernazza may also refer to:

 Livia Vernazza (1590-1655), Genoese noble and wife of Don Giovanni de' Medici
 Paolo Vernazza (b. 1979), English football player
 Santiago Vernazza (b. 1928), former Argentine football player
 Battistina Vernazza (1497-1587), Italian canoness regular and mystical writer
 Johnny 'V' Vernazza (b. 1950), American guitar player on "Fooled Around and Fell in Love"

Other uses
Vernazza (grape), another name for the Italian wine grape Bianchetta Trevigiana
Vernaccia bianca, another Italian wine grape that is also known as Vernazza
Erbaluce bianca, also known as Vernazza di Gattinara